Enrique Barόn Crespo (born 27 March 1944 in Madrid) is a Spanish politician, economist, and lawyer. He is a member of the Spanish Socialist Workers' Party and was a member of the European Parliament for the Party of European Socialists group until 2009.

Enrique Barón graduated in law from the University of Madrid and in business administration at ICADE, in Madrid, and ESSEC, in Paris, business schools, in 1965. As a practising lawyer, he specialised in labour law, and acted for defendants in political cases (1970–1977).

He was a Deputy in the Cortes (1977–1987) representing Madrid region and was Minister of Transport, Tourism and Communications (1982–1985). In that period he proposed the dismantlement of many miles of both major and secondary railway routes. The proposal was based on reports which understated the importance of these lines.

After election to the European Parliament he was President of the European Parliament (1989–1992), and was PES Group chairman from 1 November 1999 to 15 July 2004. He was Chairman of the Committee on Foreign Affairs (1992–1995).

Barόn is a member of the Board of Advisors of the Global Panel Foundation and the Advisory Board of think tank Gold Mercury International, London, UK. He is an active player in Gold Mercury's Brand EU initiative to improve the management and promotion of the European Union brand and monitor its progress.

In March 2008, Barón Crespo was received by the Italian President Giorgio Napolitano together with the CEO Pier Francesco Guarguaglini and the General Director Giorgio Zappa, at the end of the concerto for the 60th birth anniversary of the Italian arms manufacturer Finmeccanica.

References

External links
European Parliament: Your MEPs
European Parliament Office in Spain

1944 births
ESSEC Business School alumni
Grand Crosses with Star and Sash of the Order of Merit of the Federal Republic of Germany
Living people
Madrid city councillors (2003–2007)
Members of the constituent Congress of Deputies (Spain)
Members of the 1st Congress of Deputies (Spain)
Members of the 2nd Congress of Deputies (Spain)
Members of the 3rd Congress of Deputies (Spain)
MEPs for Spain 1986–1987
MEPs for Spain 1987–1989
MEPs for Spain 1989–1994
MEPs for Spain 1999–2004
MEPs for Spain 2004–2009
People from Madrid
Presidents of the European Parliament
Spanish economists
Spanish Socialist Workers' Party MEPs